Abhik Ghosh is an Indian inorganic chemist and materials scientist and a professor of chemistry at UiT – The Arctic University of Norway in Tromsø, Norway.

Early life and education
Abhik Ghosh was born in Kolkata, West Bengal, India, in 1964. His father, Subir Kumar Ghosh, was a professor of geology at Jadavpur University and his mother, Sheila Ghosh (née Sen), is a homemaker. He attended St. Lawrence High School (1971–1981) and South Point High School (1981–1983). As a child, he learned Sanskrit from his grandmother Ila Ghosh (née Roy), a language he still speaks and reads fluently. Abhik's son, Avroneel Ghosh, is a young medical doctor in Auckland, New Zealand.

Abhik obtained a B. Sc. (Honours) in chemistry from Jadavpur University, Kolkata, India, in 1987, winning the University Medal of the Faculty of Science. The same year, he moved to the University of Minnesota, where he completed a PhD under the supervision of Regents' Professor Paul G. Gassman (while also collaborating with Jan Almlöf) in 1992 and subsequently also postdoctoral research with Lawrence Que Jr. During this period, Abhik reported some of the first high-quality ab initio and density functional theory calculations on bioinorganic systems, helping lay the foundation of the now thriving field of computational bioinorganic chemistry. He did a brief, second postdoc with David Bocian at the University of California Riverside, in the course of which he derived major new insight into the problem diatomic ligand discrimination by heme proteins.

Career
After postdoctoral stints in Minnesota and California, he moved to UiT – The Arctic University of Norway in 1996, where he has remained ever since. He has had several secondary positions/affiliations: Senior Fellow of the San Diego Supercomputer Center at the University of California San Diego (1997–2004), Outstanding Younger Researcher awardee of the Research Council of Norway (2004–2010), a co-principal investigator at the national center of excellence Centre for Theoretical and Computational Chemistry (2007–2017), and a Visiting Professor at the University of Auckland, New Zealand, on many occasions (2006–2016). He edited two books, The Smallest Biomolecules: Diatomics and their Interactions with Heme Proteins (Elsevier, 2008), a monograph on the subject, and Letters to a Young Chemist (Wiley, 2011), a popular science book on careers in chemistry research. In 2014, he coauthored Arrow Pushing in Inorganic Chemistry: A Logical Approach to the Chemistry of the Main Group Elements (Wiley) with Steffen Berg, which won the 2015 Prose Award for 'best textbook in the Physical Sciences and Mathematics'. He has served on the editorial advisory board of the Journal of Biological Inorganic Chemistry (1999–2001, 2005–2007) and currently serves on the editorial boards of the Journal of Porphyrins and Phthalocyanines (2000–) and Journal of Inorganic Biochemistry (2007–present). He has authored/coauthored over 250 scientific papers, which have been cited over 11,000 times with an h-index of 63 (according to Google Scholar). He is a member of the European Academy of Sciences and has received the 2022 Hans Fischer Career Award for lifetime contributions to porphyrin science.

Research

Ghosh has contributed to many areas of porphyrin-related research. His early contributions include the use of X-ray photoelectron spectroscopy (XPS) to study short-strong hydrogen bonds in porphyrin-type molecules and also some of the first large-scale ab initio calculations applied to porphyrins and other bioinorganic systems. He has had an abiding interest in the phenomenon of ligand noninnocence and has contributed substantially to studying the phenomenon in transition metal nitrosyl and corrole derivatives. In recent years, he has developed the field of heavy element corrole derivatives, which are unusual size-mismatched metal-ligand assemblies that incorporate a large 4d or 5d transition metal ion within the sterically compressed central cavity of a corrole. In this area he has reported some of the first examples of 99Tc, rhenium, osmium, platinum, and gold corroles. Despite their size-mismatched character, many of these complexes have proved  rugged and found applications as near-IR phosphorescent photosensitizers in oxygen sensing and photodynamic therapy as well as in dye-sensitized solar cells. Ghosh's work on 4d and 5d elements has also led to new insights into metal-metal bonds (quadruple bonds) and relativistic effects.

In 2017, Ghosh and coworkers reported the first example of a stable cis tautomer of a free-base porphyrin in the form of a termolecular hydrogen-bonded complex. Subsequently, they found additional examples of porphyrin cis tautomers, proving that they can be reliably obtained from virtually any strongly porphyrin co-crystallized with two molecules of a hydrogen donor (typically water or an alcohol).

Science communication and service

In collaboration with linguist Paul Kiparsky, Ghosh has written about the possible influence of Pāṇini's Sanskrit grammar, in particular the periodic Sanskrit alphabet (the Shiva sutras), on Mendeleev's conception of the periodic table, a potentially important, new insight into the history of the periodic table. In 2022, Ghosh published a popular perspective on arrow pushing on the occasion of the 100th anniversary of its first use by Sir Robert Robinson.

Ghosh has been involved in a variety of diversity initiatives. The 2011 book Letters to a Young Chemist with a young woman as the protagonist and several contributions by leading female scientists has gone through numerous reprints and remains a bestseller. In 2020-2021, Ghosh published two biographical essays on the late Martin Gouterman, a noted porphyrin chemist and one of the first openly gay/LGBT scientists, drawing a parallel with astronomer and gay rights activist Frank Kameny (see LGBT history for a more general discussion). Subsequently, he co-edited a Virtual Issue on “Out in Inorganic Chemistry: A Celebration of LGBTQIAPN+ Inorganic Chemists” highlighting queer authors in Inorganic Chemistry and other American Chemical Society journals.

References

Further reading

External links 
 

Living people
Inorganic chemists
Bioinorganic chemists
Indian chemists
20th-century Indian chemists
Bengali chemists
Norwegian chemists
21st-century Norwegian scientists
Bengali Hindus
Jadavpur University alumni
University of Minnesota alumni
Academic staff of the University of Tromsø
Indian science writers
Gay academics
Gay scientists
Indian LGBT scientists
1964 births
Indian materials scientists
21st-century LGBT people
Indian inorganic chemists
Scientists from West Bengal